Uvariopsis is a genus of flowering plants in the family Annonaceae. The genus is unique to Africa, and consists of about 18 species, all of which are either ramiflorous, cauliflorous or both.

The type species for the genus is Uvariopsis zenkeri Engl.

Taxonomy 

The genus was first described in 1899 by Engler.

Species 

 Uvariopsis bakeriana (Hutch. & Dalziel) Robyns & Ghesq.
 Uvariopsis bisexualis Verdc.
 Uvariopsis citrata Couvreur & Niangadouma
 Uvariopsis congensis Robyns & Ghesq.
 Uvariopsis congolana (De Wild.) R.E. Fr.
 Uvariopsis dicaprio Cheek & Gosline
 Uvariopsis dioica (Diels) Robyns & Ghesq.
 Uvariopsis globiflora Keay
 Uvariopsis guineensis Keay
 Uvariopsis korupensis
 Uvariopsis letestui Pellegr.
 Uvariopsis noldeae Exell & Mendonça
 Uvariopsis pedunculosa (Diels) Robyns & Ghesq.
 Uvariopsis sessiliflora (Mildbr. & Diels) Robyns & Ghesq.
 Uvariopsis solheidii (De Wild.) Robyns & Ghesq.
 Uvariopsis submontana Kenfack, Gosline & Gereau
 Uvariopsis tripetala (Bak.f.) G.E. Schatz
 Uvariopsis vanderystii Robyns & Ghesq.
 Uvariopsis zenkeri Engl.

References 

Annonaceae
Annonaceae genera
Taxonomy articles created by Polbot
Cauliflory